Sir Peter Delmé (died 1728) was a notable British figure in commerce and banking in the early 18th century.

Delmé was the third son of Pierre Delmé and Sibella Nightingale. He became a London merchant with trade to Turkey and Portugal, and at the time of his death was reputedly the "greatest exporter of woollen goods of any one person in England." He served as an Alderman of Langbourn Ward and was knighted in 1714.  He was made Sheriff of London for 1717–18 and elected Lord Mayor of London for 1723–24.

He became a Director of the Bank of England in 1698 and served as Deputy Governor from 1713 to 1715 and as Governor from 1715 to 1717, after which he resumed his seat in the Court of Directors until his death in 1728.

Family

He married Anne Machan, daughter of Cornelius Machan, Esq. and Elizabeth Penton, on 26 January 1709. They had four children (3 sons and a daughter):

 Anne Delmé (died June 1794), who married Henry Liddell, 1st Baron Ravensworth.
 Peter Delmé (28 February 1710 – 10 April 1770), who became a politician and whose son, also called Peter Delmé, also became a politician.

He died 4 September 1728 at his home in Fenchurch Street, London, England. In his will, he left a substantial estate to his children and a bequest to Morden College. An ornate memorial in his honour is in the Guild Church of St Margaret Pattens.

References

Year of birth missing
1728 deaths
Sheriffs of the City of London
18th-century lord mayors of London
British bankers
Deputy Governors of the Bank of England
Governors of the Bank of England
Knights Bachelor